Bloody Doll is a 2014 Chinese horror thriller film directed by Teruyoshi Ishii. It was released on December 31.

Cast
Jiro Wang
Zhou Qiqi
Don Li
Jiang Jing
Shen Xinong

Reception
The film earned  at the Chinese box office.

References

External links

2014 horror thriller films
Chinese horror thriller films
2014 horror films
2014 films
2010s Mandarin-language films